In 3-dimensional topology, a part of the mathematical field of geometric topology, the Casson invariant is an integer-valued invariant of oriented integral homology 3-spheres, introduced by Andrew Casson.

Kevin Walker (1992) found an extension to rational homology 3-spheres, called the Casson–Walker invariant, and Christine Lescop (1995) extended  the invariant to all closed oriented 3-manifolds.

Definition
A Casson invariant is a surjective map
λ from oriented integral homology 3-spheres to Z satisfying the following properties:
λ(S3) = 0.
Let Σ be an integral homology 3-sphere. Then for any knot K and for any integer n, the difference

is independent of n. Here  denotes  Dehn surgery on Σ by K.
For any boundary link K ∪ L in Σ the following expression is zero:

The Casson invariant is unique (with respect to the above properties) up to an overall multiplicative constant.

Properties
If K is the trefoil then 
.
The Casson invariant is 1 (or −1) for the Poincaré homology sphere.
The Casson invariant changes sign if the orientation of M is reversed. 
The Rokhlin invariant of M is equal to the Casson invariant mod 2.
The Casson invariant is additive with respect to connected summing of homology 3-spheres. 
The Casson invariant is a sort of Euler characteristic for Floer homology.
For any integer n 

The Casson invariant is the degree 1 part of the Le–Murakami–Ohtsuki invariant.
The Casson invariant for the Seifert manifold  is given by the formula:

where

The Casson invariant as a count of representations
Informally speaking, the Casson invariant counts half the number of conjugacy classes of representations of the fundamental group of a homology 3-sphere M into the group SU(2). This can be made precise as follows.

Generalizations

Rational homology 3-spheres
Kevin Walker found an extension of the Casson invariant to rational homology 3-spheres. A Casson-Walker invariant is a surjective map λCW from oriented rational homology 3-spheres to Q satisfying the following properties:

1. λ(S3) = 0.

2. For every 1-component Dehn surgery presentation (K, μ) of an oriented rational homology sphere M′ in an oriented rational homology sphere M:
 
where:
m is an oriented meridian of a knot K and μ is the characteristic curve of the surgery.
ν is a generator the kernel of the natural map H1(∂N(K), Z) → H1(M−K, Z).
 is the intersection form on the tubular neighbourhood of the knot, N(K).

where x, y are generators of H1(∂N(K), Z) such that , v = δy for an integer δ and s(p, q) is the Dedekind sum.

Note that for integer homology spheres, the Walker's normalization is twice that of Casson's: .

Compact oriented 3-manifolds
Christine Lescop defined an extension λCWL of the Casson-Walker invariant to oriented compact 3-manifolds. It is uniquely characterized by the following properties:
If the first Betti number of M is zero, 
.
If the first Betti number of M is one, 
 
where Δ is the Alexander polynomial normalized to be symmetric and take a positive value at 1.
If the first Betti number of M is two, 
 
.
If the first Betti number of M is greater than three, .

The Casson–Walker–Lescop invariant has the following properties:
When the orientation of M changes the behavior of  depends on the first Betti number of M: if  is M with the opposite orientation, then

That is, if the first Betti number of M is odd the Casson–Walker–Lescop invariant is unchanged, while if it is even it changes sign. 
For connect-sums of manifolds

SU(N)
  
H. Boden and C. Herald (1998) used a similar approach to define an SU(3) Casson invariant for integral homology 3-spheres.

References
Selman Akbulut and John McCarthy, Casson's invariant for oriented homology 3-spheres— an exposition. Mathematical Notes, 36. Princeton University Press, Princeton, NJ, 1990. 
Michael Atiyah, New invariants of 3- and 4-dimensional manifolds. The mathematical heritage of Hermann Weyl (Durham, NC, 1987), 285–299, Proc. Sympos. Pure Math., 48, Amer. Math. Soc., Providence, RI, 1988. 
Hans Boden and Christopher Herald, The SU(3) Casson invariant for integral homology 3-spheres.  Journal of Differential Geometry 50 (1998), 147–206.
Christine Lescop, Global Surgery Formula for the Casson-Walker Invariant.  1995, 
Nikolai Saveliev, Lectures on the topology of 3-manifolds: An introduction to the Casson Invariant. de Gruyter, Berlin, 1999.  

Kevin Walker, An extension of Casson's invariant. Annals of Mathematics Studies, 126. Princeton University Press, Princeton, NJ, 1992.    

Geometric topology